The cross-country skiing events at the 2006 Winter Olympics featured 12 events, from 11 to 26 February 2006 at Pragelato in Turin.

Medal summary

Medal table

Men's events

Women's events

Participating nations
Fifty-three nations contributed competitors to the events. Below is a list of the competing nations; in parentheses are the number of national competitors.

See also
Cross-country skiing at the 2006 Winter Paralympics

References

 
2006 Winter Olympics
2006 Winter Olympics events
Olympics
Cross-country skiing competitions in Italy